Route 41, also known as Tuckers Hill Road and Beachy Cove Road, is a  north-south highway located entirely in the town of Portugal Cove-St. Philips on the island of Newfoundland, linking the Portugal Cove and St. Philips portions of town.

Route description

Route 41 begins as Tuckers Hill Road in the St. Philips portion of town at an intersection with Route 50 (St. Thomas Line/Thorburn Road). It winds its way through hilly terrain through neighbourhoods before having a Y-Intersection with Witch Hazel Drive, where the road becomes Beachy Cove Road. The highway now winds its way along the coast to enter the Portugal Cove portion of town. Route 41 comes to an end shortly thereafter at an intersection with Route 40 (Portugal Cove Road/Ferry Terminal Road), directly beside the Bell Island Ferry terminal.

Major intersections

References

041